State Route 221 (SR 221) is a state highway in Elko County, Nevada. The route, concurrent with Interstate 80 Business (I-80 Bus.) follows Chestnut Street in the city of Carlin. The highway was once part of the former route of State Route 1 and former U.S. Route 40 (US 40).

Route description

State Route 221 begins on SR 278 just south of Interstate 80 (I-80) west of downtown Carlin. From there, the route follows Chestnut Street east towards Carlin. East of the central Carlin area, SR 221 turns north to return to I-80, where the route meets its end.

History
Chestnut Street in Carlin was once designated as part State Route 1, one of the first four state highways in Nevada designated in 1917. The route was later designated part of US 40 in the original Bureau of Public Roads plan for the U.S. Highway system in 1926. Later, during the  formation of the Interstate Highway System, I-80 would eventually replace SR 1/US 40 through Carlin. In 1974, officials in Utah initiated meetings with officials in Nevada and California to truncate the route of U.S. Route 91. Nevada officials agreed and further suggested that both US 91 and US 40 be truncated. Nevada officials recommended the changes occur in 1975, when the last Nevada piece of I-15 was expected to be complete. The 1976 edition of the Official Highway map for Nevada was the first not showing the US 40 designation.

In 1976, Nevada officials began renumbering its state highway system. On July 1, 1976, the SR 1 designation was eliminated and replaced with several other routes. The portion of former SR 1 and US 40 bypassed by I-80 through Carlin was redesignated as SR 221. The route has remained relatively unchanged since then.

Major intersections

See also

References

External links

 

221
Transportation in Elko County, Nevada